Shrimp farming is an aquaculture business that exists in either a marine or freshwater environment, producing shrimp or prawns (crustaceans of the groups Caridea or Dendrobranchiata) for human consumption.

Marine

Commercial marine shrimp farming began in the 1970s, and production grew steeply, particularly to match the market demands of the United States, Japan, and Western Europe. The total global production of farmed shrimp reached more than 2.1 million tonnes in 1991, representing a value of nearly US$9 billion. About 30% of farmed shrimp is produced in Asia, particularly in China and Indonesia. The other 54.1% is produced mainly in Latin America, where Brazil, Ecuador, and Mexico are the largest producers. The largest exporting nation is Indonesia. 
 
Shrimp farming has changed from traditional, small-scale businesses in Southeast Asia into a global industry. Technological advances have led to growing shrimp at ever higher densities, and broodstock is shipped worldwide. Virtually all farmed shrimp are of the family Penaeidae, and just two species – Litopenaeus vannamei (Pacific white shrimp) 70% and Penaeus monodon (giant tiger prawn) 20% – account for roughly 90% of all farmed shrimp. 

These industrial monocultures used to be very susceptible to diseases, which caused several regional wipe-outs of farm shrimp populations in past decades. Increasing ecological problems, repeated disease outbreaks, and pressure and criticism from NGOs, consumer countries and even producers themselves, led to changes in the industry in the late 1990s and generally stronger regulation by governments. 

In 1999, a program aimed at developing and promoting more sustainable farming practices was initiated, including governmental bodies, industry representatives, and environmental organizations.

Freshwater

Freshwater prawn farming shares many characteristics with, and many of the same problems as,  marine shrimp farming. Unique problems are introduced by the developmental lifecycle of the main species (the giant river prawn, Macrobrachium rosenbergii). The global annual production of freshwater prawns in 2010 was about 670,000 tons, of which China produced 615,000 tons (92%).

Animal welfare

Eyestalk ablation is the removal of one (unilateral) or both (bilateral) eyestalks from a crustacean.  In a context of shrimp domestication, ablated females produce more eggs and for a longer time period than non ablated.

It was routinely practiced on female shrimps (or prawns) in almost every marine shrimp maturation or reproduction facility in the world, both research and commercial.  The aim of  ablation under these circumstances was to stimulate the female shrimp to develop mature ovaries and spawn.

Initial captive conditions for shrimp caused inhibitions in females that prevented them from developing mature ovaries. Domestication removed these inhibitions. Even in conditions where a given species will develop ovaries and spawn in captivity, use of eyestalk ablation was considered to increase total egg production and increased the percentage of females in a given population that participate in reproduction. Once females have been subjected to eyestalk ablation, complete ovarian development often ensues within as little as 3 to 10 days.

See also
Exploitation and conservation of mangroves
Pain in invertebrates
Integrated mangrove-shrimp aquaculture: creates less destruction of mangroves in mangrove-areas, subjected to tidal flow reducing disease
Integrated multi-trophic aquaculture: can be used to reduce diseases compared to when closed-ponds systems are used

Footnotes

References

Aquaculture
Decapods